Enoch DeMar (born September 7, 1980) is a former professional American football offensive lineman who played two seasons for the Cleveland Browns.

1980 births
Living people
Players of American football from Indianapolis
American football offensive guards
Indiana Hoosiers football players
Cleveland Browns players
Arsenal Technical High School alumni